The multi-stage booting process of Linux is in many ways similar to the BSD and other Unix-style boot processes, from which it derives.

Booting a Linux installation involves multiple stages and software components, including firmware initialization, execution of a boot loader, loading and startup of a Linux kernel image, and execution of various startup scripts and daemons.  For each of these stages and components there are different variations and approaches; for example, GRUB, coreboot or Das U-Boot can be used as boot loaders (historical examples are LILO, SYSLINUX or Loadlin), while the startup scripts can be either traditional init-style, or the system configuration can be performed through modern alternatives such as systemd or Upstart.

Overview 
Early stages of the Linux startup process depend very much on the computer architecture.  IBM PC compatible hardware is one architecture Linux is commonly used on; on these systems, the BIOS plays an important role, which might not have exact analogs on other systems.  In the following example, IBM PC compatible hardware is assumed:

 The BIOS performs startup tasks like the Power-on self-test specific to the actual hardware platform.  Once the hardware is enumerated and the hardware which is necessary for boot is initialized correctly, the BIOS loads and executes the boot code from the configured boot device.
 The boot loader often presents the user with a menu of possible boot options and has a default option, which is selected after some time passes. Once the selection is made, the boot loader loads the kernel into memory, supplies it with some parameters and gives it control.
 The kernel, if compressed, will decompress itself. It then sets up system functions such as essential hardware and memory paging, and calls start_kernel() which performs the majority of system setup (interrupts, the rest of memory management, device and driver initialization, etc.). It then starts up, separately, the idle process, scheduler, and the init process, which is executed in user space.
 The init either consists of scripts that are executed by the shell (sysv, bsd, runit) or configuration files that are executed by the binary components (systemd, upstart). Init has specific levels (sysv, bsd) or targets (systemd), each of which consists of specific set of services (daemons). These provide various non-operating system services and structures and form the user environment. A typical server environment starts a web server, database services, and networking.
 The typical desktop environment begins with a daemon, called the display manager, that starts a graphic environment which consists of a graphical server that provides a basic underlying graphical stack and a login manager that provides the ability to enter credentials and select a session. After the user has entered the correct credentials, the session manager starts a session. A session is a set of programs such as UI elements (panels, desktops, applets, etc.) which, together, can form a complete desktop environment.

On shutdown, init is called to close down all user space functionality in a controlled manner. Once all the other processes have terminated, init makes a system call to the kernel instructing it to shut the system down.

Phases

Boot loader 
The boot loader phase varies by computer architecture.  Since the earlier phases are not specific to the operating system, the BIOS-based boot process for x86 and x86-64 architectures is considered to start when the master boot record (MBR) code is executed in real mode and the first-stage boot loader is loaded. In UEFI systems, the Linux kernel can be executed directly by UEFI firmware via EFISTUB, but usually uses GRUB 2 or  systemd-boot as a boot loader. Below is a summary of some popular boot loaders:

 GRUB 2 differs from GRUB 1 by being capable of automatic detection of various operating systems and automatic configuration. The stage1 is loaded and executed either by the BIOS from the Master boot record (MBR). The intermediate stage loader (stage1.5, usually core.img) is loaded and executed by the stage1 loader. The second-stage loader (stage2, the /boot/grub/ files) is loaded by the stage1.5 and displays the GRUB startup menu that allows the user to choose an operating system or examine and edit startup parameters. After a menu entry is chosen and optional parameters are given, GRUB loads the linux kernel into memory and passes control to it. GRUB 2 is also capable of chain-loading of another boot loader. In UEFI systems, the stage1 and stage1.5 usually are the same UEFI application file (such as grubx64.efi for x64 UEFI systems).
 systemd-boot (formerly Gummiboot), a bootloader included with systemd that requires minimal configuration (for UEFI systems only).
 SYSLINUX/ISOLINUX is a boot loader that specializes in booting full Linux installations from FAT filesystems. It is often used for boot or rescue floppy discs, live USBs, and other lightweight boot systems. ISOLINUX is generally used by Linux live CDs and bootable install CDs.
 rEFInd, a boot manager for UEFI systems.
 coreboot is a free implementation of the UEFI or BIOS and usually deployed with the system board, and field upgrades provided by the vendor if need be. Parts of coreboot becomes the systems BIOS and stays resident in memory after boot.
 Das U-Boot is a boot loader for embedded systems. It is used on systems that do not have a BIOS/UEFI but rather employ custom methods to read the boot loader into memory and execute it.

Historical boot loaders, no longer in common use, include:

 LILO does not understand or parse filesystem layout. Instead, a configuration file (/etc/lilo.conf) is created in a live system which maps raw offset information (mapper tool) about location of kernel and ram disks (initrd or initramfs). The configuration file, which includes data such as boot partition and kernel pathname for each, as well as customized options if needed, is then written together with bootloader code into MBR bootsector. When this bootsector is read and given control by BIOS, LILO loads the menu code and draws it then uses stored values together with user input to calculate and load the Linux kernel or chain-load any other boot-loader.
 GRUB 1 includes logic to read common file systems at run-time in order to access its configuration file. This gives GRUB 1 ability to read its configuration file from the filesystem rather than have it embedded into the MBR, which allows it to change the configuration at run-time and specify disks and partitions in a human-readable format rather than relying on offsets. It also contains a command-line interface, which makes it easier to fix or modify GRUB if it is misconfigured or corrupt.
 Loadlin is a boot loader that can replace a running DOS or Windows 9x kernel with the Linux kernel at run time. This can be useful in the case of hardware that needs to be switched on via software and for which such configuration programs are proprietary and only available for DOS. This booting method is less necessary nowadays, as Linux has drivers for a multitude of hardware devices, but it has seen some use in mobile devices. Another use case is when the Linux is located on a storage device which is not available to the BIOS for booting: DOS or Windows can load the appropriate drivers to make up for the BIOS limitation and boot Linux from there.

Kernel 
The Linux kernel handles all operating system processes, such as memory management, task scheduling, I/O, interprocess communication, and overall system control. This is loaded in two stages – in the first stage, the kernel (as a compressed image file) is loaded into memory and decompressed, and a few fundamental functions such as basic memory management are set up. Control is then switched one final time to the main kernel start process. Once the kernel is fully operational – and as part of its startup, upon being loaded and executing – the kernel looks for an init process to run, which (separately) sets up a user space and the processes needed for a user environment and ultimate login. The kernel itself is then allowed to go idle, subject to calls from other processes.

For some platforms (like ARM 64-bit), kernel decompression has to be performed by the boot loader instead.

The kernel is typically loaded as an image file, compressed into either zImage or bzImage formats with zlib. A routine at the head of it does a minimal amount of hardware setup, decompresses the image fully into high memory, and takes note of any RAM disk if configured. It then executes kernel startup via ./arch/i386/boot/head and the startup_32 (for x86 based processors) process.

The startup function for the kernel (also called the swapper or process 0) establishes memory management (paging tables and memory paging), detects the type of CPU and any additional functionality such as floating point capabilities, and then switches to non-architecture specific Linux kernel functionality via a call to start_kernel().

start_kernel executes a wide range of initialization functions. It sets up interrupt handling (IRQs), further configures memory, starts the Init process (the first user-space process), and then starts the idle task via cpu_idle(). Notably, the kernel startup process also mounts the initial RAM disk ("initrd") that was loaded previously as the temporary root file system during the boot phase. The initrd allows driver modules to be loaded directly from memory, without reliance upon other devices (e.g. a hard disk) and the drivers that are needed to access them (e.g. a SATA driver). This split of some drivers statically compiled into the kernel and other drivers loaded from initrd allows for a smaller kernel. The root file system is later switched via a call to pivot_root() which unmounts the temporary root file system and replaces it with the use of the real one, once the latter is accessible. The memory used by the temporary root file system is then reclaimed.

Thus, the kernel initializes devices, mounts the root filesystem specified by the boot loader as read only, and runs Init (/sbin/init) which is designated as the first process run by the system (PID = 1). A message is printed by the kernel upon mounting the file system, and by Init upon starting the Init process. It may also optionally run Initrd to allow setup and device related matters (RAM disk or similar) to be handled before the root file system is mounted.

According to Red Hat, the detailed kernel process at this stage is therefore summarized as follows:
"When the kernel is loaded, it immediately initializes and configures the computer's memory and configures the various hardware attached to the system, including all processors, I/O subsystems, and storage devices. It then looks for the compressed initrd image in a predetermined location in memory, decompresses it, mounts it, and loads all necessary drivers. Next, it initializes virtual devices related to the file system, such as LVM or software RAID before unmounting the initrd disk image and freeing up all the memory the disk image once occupied. The kernel then creates a root device, mounts the root partition read-only, and frees any unused memory. At this point, the kernel is loaded into memory and operational. However, since there are no user applications that allow meaningful input to the system, not much can be done with it." An initramfs-style boot is similar, but not identical to the described initrd boot.

At this point, with interrupts enabled, the scheduler can take control of the overall management of the system, to provide pre-emptive multi-tasking, and the init process is left to continue booting the user environment in user space.

Early user space 

initramfs, also known as early user space, has been available since version 2.5.46 of the Linux kernel, with the intent to replace as many functions as possible that previously the kernel would have performed during the startup process. Typical uses of early user space are to detect what device drivers are needed to load the main user space file system and load them from a temporary filesystem. Many distributions use dracut to generate and maintain the initramfs image.

Init process 
Once the kernel has started, it starts the init process.  Historically this was the "SysV init", which was just called "init".  More recent Linux distributions are likely to use one of the more modern alternatives such as systemd.

Basically, these are grouped as operating system service-management.

See also 

 SYSLINUX
 Booting process of Windows

References

External links 
  
  a developerWorks article by M. Tim Jones
 Bootchart: Boot Process Performance Visualization
 The bootstrap process on EFI systems, LWN.net, February 11, 2015, by Matt Fleming

Booting
Linux
Linux kernel